Glad Tidings may refer to:

 Glad Tidings, a Christian magazine
 Glad Tidings (film), a 1953 British film directed by Wolf Rilla
 Glad Tidings (song), a 1970 song by  Van Morrison